Friedrich Karl Kasimir von Creutz (24 November 1724 - 6 September 1770) was a German poet, philosopher, writer and politician. He was born in Bad Homburg, where he also died, and was a councillor and ally of Frederick V, Landgrave of Hesse-Homburg.

Works
 Den Tod Seines Großmüthigsten Fürsten besinget Freyherr von Creuz, Fürstlich-Hessenhomburgischer würklicher Cammerjunker und Hofrath (1746)
 Oden und andere Gedichte (1750)
 Unpartheyische Untersuchung der Frage: ob ein regierender Herr, nach der Kayserlichen Wahl-Capitulation und anderen Reichs-Constitutionen, befugt sey sich selbst und aus eigener Macht bey der Landes-Hoheit, welche derselbe in eines abgetheilt- oder abgefundenen Herrns Land zu besitzen behauptet, zu schützen und sich in den Besitz, diesen aber aus dem Besitz einer ihm strittig gemachten Gerechtsame zu setzen? (1750)
 Oden und andere Gedichte (1752)
 Versuch über die Seele (1754)
 Seneca (1754)
 Die Gräber (1760)
 Versuch einer pragmatischen Geschichte von der merkwürdigen Zusammenkunft des teutschen Nationalgeistes und der politischen Kleinigkeiten Auf dem Römer in Frankfurt (1766)
 Der wahre Geist der Gesäze (1766)
 Neue Politische Kleinigkeiten (1767)
 Patriotische Beherzigung des berüchtigten Herrn und Dieners (1767)
 Die Reliquien unter moralischer Quarantaine (1767)
 Friederich Carl Casimirs von Creuz Oden und andere Gedichte (1769)

References

Bibliography (in German) 
 U. Bürgel: Die geistesgeschichtliche Stellung des Dichters Friedrich Carl Casmimir von Creutz in der Literatur der deutschen Aufklärung. Diss. Marburg 1949 (ungedruckt).
 Philipp Dieffenbach: Geschichte von Hessen mit besonderer Berücksichtigung des Grohßerzogthums S. 232.
 August von Doerr: Der Adel der böhmischen Kronländer; ein Verzeichnis derjenigen Wappenbriefe und Adelsdiplome welche in den Böhmischen Saalbüchern der Adelsarchives im k.k. Ministerium des Innern in Wien eingetragen sind. Band 212, 1900, darin: Erhebung zu: Alter Freiherrenstand für Johann Christian Würth von Mackau mit Freiherr von Creutz und Herr zu Würth, in Wien am 22. August 1727.
 Adalbert Elschenbroich: Creuz, Friedrich Karl Kasimir Freiherr von. In: Neue Deutsche Biographie 3 (1957), S. 413 f.
 Friedrich Lotz: Geschichte der Stadt Bad Homburg vor der Höhe. Band II. Kramer, Frankfurt a. M. 1964.
 Fried Lübbecke: Kleines Vaterland Homburg vor der Höhe. Kramer, Frankfurt am Main 1981. .
 W. Rüdiger: Von Creutz. In: Taunusbote Nr. 276/77, 1924.
 Jürgen Rainer Wolf: Landgraf Kasimir Wilhelm von Hessen-Homburg und seine vergessene Hofhaltung im Herzogtum Magdeburg. In: Aus dem Stadtarchiv. Vorträge zur Bad Hombuger Geschichte 1995/1996. Bad Homburg v.d.Höhe 1997, S. 7–27.

1724 births
1770 deaths
People from Bad Homburg vor der Höhe
18th-century German poets
18th-century German politicians
Writers from Hesse
Politicians from Hesse
Friedrich